Désiré Defauw (5 September 1885, Ghent, Belgium – 25 July 1960, Gary, Indiana, United States) was a Belgian conductor and violinist.

During World War I he became a refugee, working in London where in 1917 he appeared at the Wigmore Hall performing John Ireland's Violin Sonata No. 2 with the composer at the piano.

He was professor of conducting at the Brussels Conservatory and was the first conductor of the Orchestre National de Belgique from 1937. He left Belgium for North America in 1940 and was music director of the Montreal Symphony Orchestra from 1941 to 1952 and also music director of the Chicago Symphony Orchestra from 1943 to 1947. In 1947 he recorded the Mendelssohn Violin Concerto with the CSO and Mischa Elman as soloist.
Defauw, who later served as music director of the Grand Rapids Symphony in Grand Rapids, Michigan, from 1954 to 1958, also was a composer.  He was simultaneously the conductor of the Bloomington-Normal Symphony Orchestra (IL) from 1953 to 1958 (ref. https://www.mchistory.org/research/finding-aids/collection/bloomington-normal-symphony).

References

Sources
 Foreman, Lewis (ed). The John Ireland Companion Woodbridge: The Boydell Press, 2011.

External links
Désiré Defauw biography at the Bach Cantatas Website
Désiré Defauw biography at Rootsweb

1885 births
1960 deaths
Belgian conductors (music)
Male conductors (music)
Belgian emigrants to the United States
Belgian refugees
20th-century conductors (music)
20th-century violinists
20th-century Belgian male musicians